Hasan Yiğit (born 2 January 1975 in Istanbul) is a retired Turkish football midfielder. During his career, Yiğit played for Gaziantepspor, Kocaelispor, Diyarbakırspor, Ankaraspor, Bursaspor, Denizlispor, Sakaryaspor, Çaykur Rizespor and Güngörenspor.

Honours 
 Kocaelispor
Turkish Cup (1): 2002

External links

1975 births
Living people
Footballers from Istanbul
Turkish footballers
Gaziantepspor footballers
Kocaelispor footballers
Diyarbakırspor footballers
Ankaraspor footballers
Bursaspor footballers
Sakaryaspor footballers
Denizlispor footballers
Çaykur Rizespor footballers
Turkey under-21 international footballers
Association football defenders
Mediterranean Games silver medalists for Turkey
Competitors at the 1997 Mediterranean Games
Mediterranean Games medalists in football